Croft is an unincorporated community in Menard County, Illinois, United States. Croft is south of Middletown and west of Broadwell.

References

Unincorporated communities in Menard County, Illinois
Unincorporated communities in Illinois